Winona LaDuke (born August 18, 1959) is an American economist, environmentalist, writer and industrial hemp grower, known for her work on tribal land claims and preservation, as well as sustainable development.

In 1996 and 2000, she ran for Vice President of the United States as the nominee of the Green Party of the United States, on a ticket headed by Ralph Nader. She is the executive director and a co-founder (along with the Indigo Girls) of Honor the Earth, a Native environmental advocacy organization that played an active role in the Dakota Access Pipeline protests.

In 2016, she received an electoral vote for vice president. In doing so, she became the first Green Party member to receive an electoral vote.

Early life and education

Winona (meaning "first daughter" in Dakota language) LaDuke was born in 1959 in Los Angeles, California, to Betty Bernstein and Vincent LaDuke (later known as Sun Bear). Her father was from the Ojibwe White Earth Reservation in Minnesota, and her mother of Jewish European ancestry from The Bronx, New York. LaDuke spent some of her childhood in Los Angeles, but was primarily raised in Ashland, Oregon. Due to her father's heritage, she was enrolled with the Ojibwe Nation at an early age, but did not live at White Earth, or any other reservation, until 1982. She started work at White Earth after graduating from college, when she got a job there as principal of the high school.

After her parents married, Vincent LaDuke worked as an actor in Hollywood in supporting roles in Western movies, while Betty LaDuke completed her academic studies. The couple separated when Winona was five, and her mother took a position as an art instructor at Southern Oregon College, now Southern Oregon University at Ashland, then a small logging and college town near the California border. In the 1980s, Vincent reinvented himself as a New Age spiritual leader by the name Sun Bear.

While growing up in Ashland, LaDuke attended public school and was on the debate team in high school. She attended Harvard University, where she joined a group of Indigenous activists, and graduated in 1982 with a Bachelor of Arts in economics (rural economic development). When she moved to White Earth, she did not know the Ojibwe language, or many people, and was not quickly accepted. While working as the principal of the local Minnesota reservation high school she completed research for her master's thesis on the reservation's subsistence economy and became involved in local issues. She completed an M.A. in Community Economic Development through Antioch University's distance-learning program.

Career and activism

While attending Harvard, LaDuke heard a presentation by Jimmie Durham which she asserted "shook something loose" in her and changed her life. She worked for Durham, investigating the effects of uranium mining in Navajo reservations. After graduating, she moved to her father's community at White Earth, where she found work as the principal at the high school. In 1985 she helped found the Indigenous Women's Network. She worked with Women of All Red Nations to publicize American forced sterilization of Native American women.

Next she became involved in the struggle to recover lands for the Anishinaabe. An 1867 treaty with the United States provided a territory of more than 860,000 acres for the White Earth Indian Reservation. Under the Nelson Act of 1889, an attempt to have the Anishinaabe assimilate by adopting a European-American model of subsistence farming, communal tribal land was allotted to individual households. The US classified any excess land as surplus, allowing it to be sold to non-natives. In addition, many Anishinaabe sold their land individually over the years; these factors caused the tribe to lose control of most of its land. By the mid-20th century, the tribe held only one-tenth of the land in its reservation.

In 1989, LaDuke founded the White Earth Land Recovery Project (WELRP) in Minnesota with the proceeds of a human rights award from Reebok. The goal is to buy back land in the reservation that non-Natives bought and to create enterprises that provide work to Anishinaabe. By 2000, the foundation had bought 1,200 acres, which it held in a conservation trust for eventual cession to the tribe.

WELRP is also working to reforest the lands and revive cultivation of wild rice, long a traditional food. It markets that and other traditional products, including hominy, jam, buffalo sausage, and other products. It has started an Ojibwe language program, a herd of buffalo, and a wind-energy project.

LaDuke is also executive director of Honor the Earth, an organization she co-founded with the non-Native folk-rock duo the Indigo Girls in 1993. The organization's mission is:

to create awareness and support for Native environmental issues and to develop needed financial and political resources for the survival of sustainable Native communities. Honor the Earth develops these resources by using music, the arts, the media, and Indigenous wisdom to ask people to recognize our joint dependency on the Earth and be a voice for those not heard.

The Evergreen State College class of 2014 chose LaDuke to be a keynote speaker. She delivered her address at the school's graduation on June 13, 2014.

In 2016, LaDuke was involved in the Dakota Access Pipeline protests, participating at the resistance camps in North Dakota and speaking to the media on the issue.

At the July 2019 National Audubon Convention in Milwaukee, LaDuke gave the keynote address with updates on efforts to stop the Sandpiper pipeline, other pipelines, and other projects near Ojibwe waters and through the Leech Lake Reservation. She urged everyone to be water protectors and stand up for their rights.

In 2020 and 2021, she was a leader of the protests against the Line 3 pipeline.

Political career

In 1996 and 2000, LaDuke ran as the vice-presidential candidate with Ralph Nader on the Green Party ticket. She was not endorsed by any tribal council or other tribal government. LaDuke endorsed the Democratic Party ticket for president and vice-president in 2004, 2008, and 2012.

In 2016, Robert Satiacum, Jr., a faithless elector from Washington, cast his presidential vote for Native American activist Faith Spotted Eagle and his vice-presidential vote for LaDuke, making her the first Green Party member and the first Native American woman to receive an Electoral College vote for vice president.

White Earth Land Recovery Project

WELRP has worked to revive cultivation and harvesting of wild rice, a traditional Ojibwe food. It produces and sells traditional foods and crafts through its label, Native Harvest.

Honor the Earth

Honor the Earth is a national advocacy group encouraging public support and funding for Native environmental groups. It works nationally and internationally on issues of climate change, renewable energy, sustainable development, food systems and environmental justice. Members of Honor the Earth were active in the Dakota Access Pipeline protests.

Hemp activism 
LaDuke operates a 40-acre (16 ha) industrial hemp farm on the White Earth Indian Reservation, growing hemp varieties from different regions of the world, vegetables and tobacco. She has said that she turned to industrial hemp farming after being urged to investigate the practice for several years and advocates its potential to turn the American economy away from fossil fuels. LaDuke has promoted the growth of both marijuana and industrial hemp on Indigenous tribal lands for financial profit and the localization of the economy. Her position can be considered controversial given experiences of other reservations, such as the Oglala Sioux Tribe, who were raided by the DEA in relation to hemp farming.

Marriage
In 1988, LaDuke married Cree Randy Kapashesit of Moose Factory, Ontario, Canada. They separated in 1992.

Selected publications

Books
Last Standing Woman (1997), novel.
All our Relations: Native Struggles for Land and Life (1999), about the drive to reclaim tribal land for ownership
Recovering the Sacred: the Power of Naming and Claiming (2005), a book about traditional beliefs and practices.
The Militarization of Indian Country (2013)
The Sugar Bush (1999)
The Winona LaDuke Reader: A Collection of Essential Writings (2002)
All Our Relations: Native Struggles for Land and Life (2016)
To Be A Water Protector: The Rise of the Wiindigoo Slayers (2020)

As co-author
Conquest: Sexual Violence and American Indian Genocide
Grassroots: A Field Guide for Feminist Activism
Sister Nations: Native American Women Writers on Community
Struggle for the Land: Native North American Resistance to Genocide, Ecocide, and Colonization
Cutting Corporate Welfare
Ojibwe Waasa Inaabidaa: We Look in All Directions
New Perspectives on Environmental Justice: Gender, Sexuality, and Activism
Make a Beautiful Way: The Wisdom of Native American Women
How to Say I Love You in Indian
Earth Meets Spirit: A Photographic Journey Through the Sacred Landscape
Otter Tail Review: Stories, Essays and Poems from Minnesota's Heartland
Daughters of Mother Earth: The Wisdom of Native American Women

Her editorials and essays have been published in national and international media.

Filmography
Television and film appearances:
 Appearance in the 1997 documentary film Anthem, directed by Shainee Gabel and Kristin Hahn. 
Appearance in the 1990 Canadian documentary film Uranium, directed by Magnus Isacsson.
 Appearance in the TV documentary The Main Stream. 
 Appearance on The Colbert Report on June 12, 2008.
 Featured in 2017 full-length documentary First Daughter and the Black Snake, directed by Keri Pickett. Chronicles LaDuke's opposition against the Canadian-owned Enbridge plans to route a pipeline through land granted to her tribe in an 1855 Treaty.

Legacy and honors
 1994, LaDuke was nominated by Time magazine as one of America's fifty most promising leaders under forty years of age.
 1996, she was given the Thomas Merton Award
 1997, she was granted the BIHA Community Service Award
 1998, she won the Reebok Human Rights Award.
 1998, Ms. Magazine named her Woman of the Year for her work with Honor the Earth.
 Ann Bancroft Award for Women's Leadership Fellowship.
 2007, she was inducted into the National Women's Hall of Fame.
 2015, she received an honorary doctorate degree from Augsburg College.
 2017, she received the Alice and Clifford Spendlove Prize in Social Justice, Diplomacy and Tolerance, at the University of California, Merced.

Burning of house and artefacts
On November 9, 2008, LaDuke's house in Ponsford, Minnesota, burned down while she was in Boston. No one was injured, but all her personal property burned, including her extensive library and indigenous art and artifact collection.

Electoral history

1996 election

2000 election

2016 election
Electoral vote for vice president

See also
List of writers from peoples indigenous to the Americas

References

Further reading
 Andrews, Max (Ed.), Land, Art: A Cultural Ecology Handbook. London, Royal Society of Arts, 2006, . Interview with Winona LaDuke

External links

Honor the Earth, Official Website

Winona LaDuke at nativeharvest.com
Winona LaDuke, Voices from the Gap, University of Minnesota

VP Acceptance Speech, 1996 Green Party Convention
"Nader's No. 2" at Salon.com (July 13, 2000)
Winona LaDuke interview with Majora Carter of The Promised Land radio show (2000)

1959 births
20th-century American novelists
20th-century American politicians
20th-century American women writers
Economists from California
American environmentalists
American feminists
American non-fiction environmental writers
American people of Russian-Jewish descent
American women novelists
Antioch College alumni
Ecofeminists
Female candidates for Vice President of the United States
Green Party of the United States vice presidential nominees
Harvard University alumni
Indigenous American philosophy
Jewish American candidates for Vice President of the United States
Jewish American writers
Living people
Minnesota Greens
Native American activists
Native American environmentalists
American women environmentalists
Native American novelists
Native American candidates for Vice President of the United States
Native American women in politics
Native American women writers
Native Americans' rights activists
Ojibwe people
Reproductive rights activists
1996 United States vice-presidential candidates
2000 United States vice-presidential candidates
American women economists
Writers from Ashland, Oregon
Writers from Los Angeles
Novelists from Minnesota
Activists from California
20th-century American women politicians
Novelists from Oregon
American women non-fiction writers
Economists from Oregon
20th-century American economists
21st-century American economists
Novelists from California
White Earth Band of Ojibwe
21st-century American women
Women civil rights activists
21st-century American Jews
20th-century Native American women
20th-century Native Americans
21st-century Native American women
21st-century Native Americans